Septoria are ascomycete pycnidia-producing fungi that cause numerous leaf spot diseases on field crops, forages and many vegetables including tomatoes which are known to contract Septoria musiva from nearby cottonwood trees, and is responsible for yield losses. The genus is widespread, and estimated to contain 1072 species. Pycnidia produce needle-like pycnidiospores.

Septoria apiicola is the cause of late blight of celery. It is characterized by the production of conidia within pycnidia. The symptoms include chlorotic spots that turn brown and necrotic. Septoria apiicola can survive on seeds.

Several species of passion flower are infected by several species of Septoria, and a fungus, which has been going by the name Septoria passiflorae but which is probably an undescribed species, has been used to control the invasive Passiflora tarminiana in Hawai'i.

Taxonomy
In 2013, two large volumes (about 80 pages a piece) on Septoria and septoria-like fungi were published in the open access journal Studies in Mycology. In these papers by Quaedvlieg et al. and Verkley et al., the genus Septoria is clearly defined and identification techniques are discussed in detail. Besides going into detail about the genus Septoria s. str., many septoria-like genera are discussed and clearly illustrated.

Species include:

References

 
Fungal plant pathogens and diseases
Mycosphaerellaceae genera
Taxa named by Pier Andrea Saccardo
Taxa described in 1884